"Ring Out, Wild Bells" is a poem by Alfred, Lord Tennyson. Published in 1850, the year he was appointed Poet Laureate, it forms part of In Memoriam, Tennyson's elegy to Arthur Henry Hallam, his sister's fiancé who died at the age of 22.

According to a story widely held in Waltham Abbey, and repeated on many websites (see two examples below), the 'wild bells' in question were the bells of the Abbey Church. According to the local story, Tennyson was staying at High Beach in the vicinity and heard the bells being rung on New Year's Eve. 

It is an accepted English custom to ring English Full circle bells to ring out the old year and ring in the new year over midnight on New Year's Eve. Sometimes the bells are rung half-muffled for the death of the old year, then the muffles are removed to ring without muffling to mark the birth of the new year.  In some versions of the story it was a particularly stormy night and the bells were being swung by the wind rather than by ringers, but this is highly unlikely given the method of ringing English full circle bells, which requires a considerable swinging arc before the clappers will strike the bell.

The poem

Ring out, wild bells, to the wild sky,
The flying cloud, the frosty light:
The year is dying in the night;
Ring out, wild bells, and let him die.

 
Ring out the old, ring in the new,
Ring, happy bells, across the snow:
The year is going, let him go;
Ring out the false, ring in the true.

 
Ring out the grief that saps the mind
For those that here we see no more;
Ring out the feud of rich and poor,
Ring in redress to all mankind.

 
Ring out a slowly dying cause,
And ancient forms of party strife;
Ring in the nobler modes of life,
With sweeter manners, purer laws.

 
Ring out the want, the care, the sin,
The faithless coldness of the times;
Ring out, ring out my mournful rhymes
But ring the fuller minstrel in.

 
Ring out false pride in place and blood,
The civic slander and the spite;
Ring in the love of truth and right,
Ring in the common love of good.

 
Ring out old shapes of foul disease;
Ring out the narrowing lust of gold;
Ring out the thousand wars of old,
Ring in the thousand years of peace.

 
Ring in the valiant man and free,
The larger heart, the kindlier hand;
Ring out the darkness of the land,
Ring in the Christ that is to be.

Allusions
The Gresham's School chapel bell is inscribed with the last line of the poem, plus an attribution to the donor: "Ring in the Christ that is to be, Donum Dedit J. R. E."

Manchester Town Hall's hour bell, completed in 1850, which is called "Great Abel" after the Town Clerk, Abel Heywood, who oversaw the construction of the building, has the lines "Ring out the false, ring in the true" cast upon its surface.

Translations
A translation into Swedish by Edvard Fredin called "Nyårsklockan" – "The New Year's Bell" – is recited just before the stroke of midnight at the annual New Year's Eve festivities at Skansen in Stockholm, capital of Sweden. This tradition began in 1897 when the young Swedish actor Anders de Wahl was asked to recite the poem. De Wahl then performed the poem annually until his death in 1956. Since 1977 the Swedish national public TV broadcaster, SVT, has aired the event live, and the first to read the poem on television was the actor Georg Rydeberg. The show turned out to be a major success, and watching it on New Year's Eve quickly became a nationwide tradition. Rydeberg recited the poem until his death in 1983. After that many famous Swedish actors and/or singers have recited the poem, for example Jarl Kulle, Jan Malmsjö and Margaretha Krook. The Swedish translation differs significantly from the English original. Inspired by the Swedish tradition, auto manufacturer Volvo used the poem in a 2016 New Year's Eve advertisement.

Musical settings

Charles Gounod's setting for voice and piano, published in 1880, uses verses one, two, three, five, seven, and eight.

Percy Fletcher's 1914 SATB setting includes all but the fifth stanza of the poem, using the second stanza as a recurring refrain

The second, seventh and eighth stanzas were set to music by Karl Jenkins in the finale ("Better is Peace") of The Armed Man.

The first, second and last stanzas were set to music by Crawford Gates; this setting is included in the Church of Jesus Christ of Latter-day Saints 1985 hymnal (hymn number 215).

The first, second, third, fifth and seventh stanzas were set to music by Jonathan Dove for the final movement of his "Passing of the Year" song cycle, written for double choir (SSAATTBB).

James Q Mullholland set the 1st, 2nd, 3rd, 5th and 7th stanzas to music in honour of Gary Schwartzhoff in a piece commissioned by members and friends at First Congregational Church, Eau Claire, Wisconsin in 2011. It was first sung by the UW Eau Claire Concert Choir on Sunday, 10 April 2011, and again by the Chancel Choir of First Congregational Church on Sunday, 22 May 2011.

Excerpts of the poem were also used by George Harrison in his song "Ding Dong, Ding Dong" ("Ring out the old – Ring in the new. Ring out the false – Ring in the true"). But Harrison attributed these passages to Sir Frank Crisp, having seen them engraved on walls and other parts of Friar Park, the mansion he bought which had once belonged to Sir Frank.

It forms the final song of Ballads for Christmas by Andrew Downes for high voices and harp.

Jonathan Ward of Magdalen College School composed a setting, while Wiltshire-based composer Stuart Brown has used it as the opening of his song cycle "Idylls", written in 2014 for the London-based soprano Chen Wang.

The composer Simon Gray, performing as The Winterval Conspiracy, set and performed the whole poem as the final song on his album Now That's What I Call 2020!

Augusta Read Thomas's Ring Out, Wild Bells, to the Wild Sky uses the text of the first, second, and eighth stanzas and excerpts from the fourth, sixth, and ninth stanzas along with text from other sections of In Memoriam A.H.H..

Notes

External links
three stanzas set to music
Free MP3 download
 Performance rendered by The Plain Healers
Waltham Abbey Town Council with reference to 'wild bells'
: Essex County Council (PDF) with reference to 'wild bells'
Guide to Waltham Abbey church
 
 Video of half-muffled English full circle-ringing, first eight bells, then one bell tolling
 Simon James Gray / The Winterval Conspiracy setting

Poetry by Alfred, Lord Tennyson
1850 poems
Bells (percussion)